Lovča is a village and municipality in Žiar nad Hronom District in the Banská Bystrica Region of central Slovakia.

References

External links

Villages and municipalities in Žiar nad Hronom District